The Federal Ministry of Education and Research, abbreviated BMBF, is a cabinet-level ministry of Germany. It is headquartered in Bonn, with an office in Berlin. The Ministry provides funding for research projects and institutions (aiming for "research excellence") and sets general educational policy. It also provides student loans in Germany. However, a large part of educational policy in Germany is decided at the state level, strongly limiting the influence of the ministry in educational matters.

History
The Federal Ministry for Atomic Issues was established in 1955, concentrating on research in the peaceful use of nuclear energy. The ministry was renamed in 1962 to Federal Ministry of Scientific Research, with a broader scope; it was renamed again, to Federal Ministry of Education and Science, in 1969.

A separate ministry, the Federal Ministry of Research and Technology, was established in 1972. The two Ministries merged in 1994 to form the Federal Ministry for Education, Science, Research and Technology; this title was shortened to Federal Ministry for Education and Research in 1998.

Organization

The BMBF currently has eight directorates-general (as at November 2020). These are in addition to the central directorate-general that is responsible for administrative tasks:

 Directorate-General 1: Policy Issues and Strategies
 Directorate-General 2: European and International Cooperation in Education and Research
 Directorate-General 3: General Education and Vocational Training; Lifelong Learning
 Directorate-General 4: Higher Education and Research System
 Directorate-General 5: Research for Technological Sovereignty and Innovation
 Directorate-General 6: Life Sciences
 Directorate-General 7: Provision for the Future - Basic Research and Research for Sustainable Development

Each directorate-general consists of one or two subdivisions and 10 to 15 units. The greater part of the subdivisions is located in Bonn, the smaller part in Berlin. The BMBF has around 1000 employees. The head of the BMBF is formed by two parliamentary secretaries and two permanent state secretaries in addition to the minister.

Federal Ministers
Political Party:

See also
 Bio-economy Research and Technology Council
 German Historical Institutes
 Kultusministerkonferenz (Conference of Ministers of Education (State Government in Germany))
 Open access in Germany
 Perspectivia.net

References

External links
Official English website

Education and Research
Germany
Germany
Germany, Education and Research
1955 establishments in West Germany